The 1974 Bowling Green Falcons football team was an American football team that represented Bowling Green University in the Mid-American Conference (MAC) during the 1974 NCAA Division I football season. In their seventh season under head coach Don Nehlen, the Falcons compiled a 6–4–1 record (2–3 against MAC opponents), finished in fifth place in the MAC, and outscored their opponents by a combined total of 249 to 203.

The team's statistical leaders included Mark Miller with 725 passing yards, Dave Preston with 1,414 rushing yards, and John Boles with 291 receiving yards.

Schedule

References

Bowling Green
Bowling Green Falcons football seasons
Bowling Green Falcons football